ν Persei, Latinized as Nu Persei, is a single star and a suspected variable in the northern constellation of Perseus. It has a yellow-white hue and is visible to the naked eye with an apparent visual magnitude of 3.80. This object is located approximately 560 light-years from the Sun based on parallax but is drifting closer with a radial velocity of −12 km/s.

This object is a highly luminous bright giant star with a stellar classification of F5II. It has five times the mass of the Sun but has expanded to around 21 times the Sun's radius. The star has a relatively high rotation rate, spinning with a projected rotational velocity of 48.9 km/s. It is radiating 604 times the luminosity of the Sun from its enlarged photosphere at an effective temperature of 6,300 K.

Several visual companions beside the primary have been recorded. B, with magnitude 12.1 and separation 31.6", has its own companion, E, with magnitude 14.3 and separation 7.7". Additionally, C has magnitude 13.2 and separation 55.7", and D has magnitude 13.8  and separation 22.8".

References

External links

F-type bright giants
Suspected variables
Perseus (constellation)
Persei, Nu
Persei, 41
BD+42 815
023230
017529
1135